Valdemarsvik Municipality (Valdemarsviks kommun) is a municipality in Östergötland County in southeast Sweden. Its seat is located in the town of Valdemarsvik.

Valdemarsvik was originally a market town (köping) under the city of Söderköping. When the first local government acts came into force in Sweden in 1863 Valdemarsvik was not made a municipality of its own, but part of Ringarum. It was detached from Ringarum in 1914. The municipal reform of 1971 created the present municipality by reuniting Ringarum with Valdemarsvik and also adding Gryt and a part of the dissolved Tjust-Ed. The latter territory was transferred from Kalmar County.

Geographically, it is notable for an archipelago and a harbour.

Sights

The local church is from the 1870s, with extensive renovations in the early 20th century.

Notable natives
Lena Ek, former member of the European Parliament and the Riksdag, lives in Valdemarsvik
Nils Liedholm, professional soccer player, was born and raised in Valdemarsvik

Elections

Riksdag
These are the results of the Riksdag elections of Söderköping Municipality since the 1972 municipality reform. The results of the Sweden Democrats were not published by SCB between 1988 and 1998 at a municipal level to the party's small nationwide size at the time. "Turnout" denotes the percentage of the electorate casting a ballot, whereas "Votes" only denotes valid votes.

Blocs

This lists the relative strength of the socialist and centre-right blocs since 1973, but parties not elected to the Riksdag are inserted as "other", including the Sweden Democrats results from 1988 to 2006, but also the Christian Democrats pre-1991 and the Greens in 1982, 1985 and 1991. The sources are identical to the table above. The coalition or government mandate marked in bold formed the government after the election. New Democracy got elected in 1991 but are still listed as "other" due to the short lifespan of the party. "Elected" is the total number of percentage points from the municipality that went to parties who were elected to the Riksdag.

References

External links

Valdemarsvik Municipality - Official site
Article Valdemarsvik - From Nordisk familjebok (in Swedish)

Municipalities of Östergötland County